The 2013 IPP Open and the Orto-Lääkärit Open were professional tennis tournaments played on indoor hard courts. It was the 13th edition of the men's tournament which was part of the 2013 ATP Challenger Tour, offering a total of €42,500 in prize money, and sixth edition of the women's tournament, which was part of the 2013 ITF Women's Circuit, offering a total of $10,000 in prize money. The two events took place together at the Tali Tennis Center in Helsinki, Finland, on 11–17 November 2013.

Men's singles entrants

Seeds 

 1 Rankings as of 4 November 2013

Other entrants 
The following players received wildcards into the singles main draw:
  Karen Khachanov
  Micke Kontinen
  Jarkko Nieminen
  Herkko Pöllänen

The following players received entry from the qualifying draw:
  Jacob Adaktusson
  Egor Gerasimov
  Denis Matsukevich
  Ante Pavić

Women's singles entrants

Seeds 

 1 Rankings as of 4 November 2013

Other entrants 
The following players received wildcards into the singles main draw:
  Nanette Nylund
  Petra Piirtola
  Olivia Pimia
  Johanna Ranta-Aho

The following players received entry from the qualifying draw:
  Anastasia Artemova
  Rona Berisha
  Valeria Gorlats
  Elina Joronen
  Fanny Östlund
  Yana Parshina
  Annika Sillanpää
  Roosa Timonen

The following players received entry into the singles main draw as lucky losers:
  Milana Gasymova
  Kristina Parviainen

Champions

Men's singles 

  Jarkko Nieminen def.  Ričardas Berankis 6–3, 6–1

Women's singles 

  Jeļena Ostapenko def.  Susanne Celik 7–5, 4–6, 7–5

Men's doubles 

  Henri Kontinen /  Jarkko Nieminen def.  Dustin Brown /  Philipp Marx 7–5, 5–7, [10–5]

Women's doubles 

  Jeļena Ostapenko /  Eva Paalma def.  Quirine Lemoine /  Martina Přádová 6–2, 5–7, [11–9]

External links 
 

2013 ATP Challenger Tour
Orto-Laakarit Open
2013